Columbia International College is a private boarding preparatory school in the Ainslie Wood neighbourhood of Hamilton, Ontario, Canada. As of 2014, the school has students from over 70 countries.

Columbia is a member of the Independent School Associations of Ontario (ISAO). The College is also registered with the Ministry of Education (Ontario)

History

Founded in Hamilton, Ontario, in 1979, Columbia International College began as a six-room university preparatory and ESL school on Mohawk Road West. It was known at the time as Columbia Secondary School of Canada.  The school quickly outgrew this location, prompting a move to 430 East 25th Street in 1981 and another move to 1029 Main Street West in 1985; by this time, Columbia had a student population of 300. Ten years later, in 1991, Columbia Secondary School officially changed its name to Columbia International College.

The 1990s saw growth in Columbia's facilities, academic programs and student population. The school's climb in enrollment numbers resulted in a relocation to the Ainsliewood Campus in 2000. The school's current home is an 11,200 square metre facility located at 1003 Main Street West.

Academics

Columbia has six semesters: January, March, June, July, August and October. The school also offers year-round admission.

Columbia International College has about 1800 students that are from 73+ countries.

Testing services offered

Columbia is an Official Test Centre for:
iBT TOEFL (Princeton University ETS authorized centre)
IELTS (International English Language Testing System)
The Michigan English Language Assessment Battery (MELAB)
Canadian Academic English Language Assessment (CAEL)
Secondary School Admissions Test (SSAT)

Residences

Columbia International College currently has five single-gender residence buildings: three for males and two for females. The male residences are Oak Hall, Pine Hall and Northcliffe. The female residences are Linden Hall and Pine Girls.

Extracurricular activities

Columbia's Student Development Office assists students with their after-school schedules and events on campus and within residence. They offer clubs and activities based on Leadership, Arts, Community Service and Athletics.

Bark Lake Leadership Center

Bark Lake is Columbia's private Leadership and Outdoor Education Center. It is a 700-acre facility located in Haliburton County, Ontario.

Throughout the year, frequent trips are made to Bark Lake for students to complete leadership training.

Principals

References
Notes

External links

Columbia International College

Education in Hamilton, Ontario
High schools in Hamilton, Ontario
Preparatory schools in Ontario
Private schools in Ontario
Middle schools in Hamilton, Ontario
Boarding schools in Ontario
Middle schools in Ontario
Educational institutions established in 1978
1978 establishments in Ontario